Fatima Angelica Lontoc Cruz, also known by her screen name Timmy Cruz, is a Filipina singer and movie actress.

Career
Cruz became popular in the 1980s for her songs "Boy", "Joke Lang" and "Tingin".

She also starred in films produced by Viva Films such as Kumander Bawang: Kalaban ng Mga Aswang (1988), Kung Kasalanan Man (1989), Pangarap Na Ginto (1990), Di Na Natuto (1993) and The Sarah Balabagan Story (1997). She played as the leading lady of Joey de Leon in Sheman: Mistress of the Universe, Eddie Garcia in Alfredo Lim: Batas ng Maynila and Fernando Poe Jr. in Batas ng .45.

She appeared in the GMA Network television series Villa Quintana (1995), Halik sa Apoy (1998), and Sinner or Saint (2011). She appeared also in ABS-CBN 2 TV series Lobo (2008), Love Is Only in the Movies (2010), and Kapitan Inggo (2011).

Cruz has turned into a Gospel singer under Praise Music. Cruz was awarded the 2009 Fr. Neri Satur Environmental Heroism Award.

Personal life
Her father is Atty. Angel Cruz and mother is Lourdes Lontok, businesswoman and civic leader. She finished her degree in Business Administration at University of the Philippines, and degrees in Banking and Finance at the University of San Francisco in California, USA.

Filmography

Television

Film

Discography
Timmy Cruz (1987, Blackgold Records)
Take Care (1988, Blackgold Records)
Kakaiba (1990, Blackgold Records)
Magka-ibigan (1992, Blackgold Records)
UpTimmystic (Praise Records)
In-Tim-8 (2010, Star Records)

References

External links

1966 births
Living people
20th-century Filipino actresses
21st-century Filipino actresses
20th-century Filipino women singers